Location number may refer to:

Global Location Number, part of the GS1 systems of standards
Location number (book), a method for displaying citeable page numbers in e-books